or  is a lake in the municipality of Nærøysund in Trøndelag county, Norway.

See also
List of lakes in Norway

References

Lakes of Trøndelag
Nærøysund
Nærøy